Vadia or Vadiya is a census town in Amreli district in the Indian state of Gujarat. Vadia (Vadiya) is the small sub-Taluka category town of Amreli District. Vadiya and Kunkavav is now joint Taluka of Amreli. Vadiya is becoming well-developing town because of the good Governance of Suragvala before British rule. Vadia is situated 35 km. south-east form Gondal, 25 km. east from Jetpur.

References

Villages in Amreli district